L. N. Shastri (also credited as Chaitanya; 30 August 1971 – 30 August 2017) was an Indian playback singer and music composer who primarily worked in Kannada cinema. Starting his career as a playback singer in the film Ajagajantara (1991), Shastri went on to sing for more than 3000 songs. Upon his friends' suggestion, he renamed himself as Chaitanya and composed music for over 25 films starting with Kanasalu Neene Manasalu Neene (1998). However, he dropped the name due to the identity crisis for the film Bellary Naga (2009).

His biggest hit song as a singer has been "Kolumande Jangamadevaru" from the film Janumada Jodi (1996) which gave him a career break and also fetched him the Karnataka State Film Award for Best Male Playback Singer. He was closely associated with prominent music directors in Kannada film industry including Hamsalekha, V. Manohar, V. Harikrishna, Gurukiran, Arjun Janya and Anoop Seelin who have been the main support for his growing career since his initial days.

L. N. Shastri was married to fellow singer Suma. Suma Shastri has sung for more than 50 films.

Career
In the early 1990s, Shastri was mainly seen singing track songs for major playback singers like S. P. Balasubrahmanyam and others. The film Ajagajantara (1991) composed by Hamsalekha offered him a chance to share the mic with Balasubrahmanyam for the song "Love Love Loveah". Following this, Shastri teamed up with composer V. Manohar and sang many songs for the films that featured actor Jaggesh in the lead. The songs "Anthintha Gandu Naanalla" from Bhanda Nanna Ganda (1992), "Priya Priya" from Super Nanna Maga (1992), "Dagar Dagar" from Tharle Nan Maga (1992), "Avanalli Ivalilli" from Shhh (1993) were some of his early hits which appealed to the masses. In the meantime, Shastri was working as an assistant composer to both Hamsalekha and V. Manohar for all their films.

In 1996, the folk song "Kolumande Jangamadevaru" composed by V. Manohar and picturized on actor Shiva Rajkumar for the film Janumada Jodi turned his fortunes. The song became an ultimate hit and his rendition was widely acclaimed by critics and masses. He was awarded  the Karnataka State Award for this song. Following this, he recorded many songs for all the music directors of the 1990s through 2000s. Many of his songs have been received extremely well by the masses.

In 1998, Shastri turned into a complete music director with the film Kanasalu Neene Manasalu Neene. Though the songs were received well, the film's dismal performance at the box-office could not help boost the songs. His next composition for the V. Ravichandran starrer Ravimama (1999) was also appreciated. Following this, he composed for about 25 feature films which could not help him to be among the top ranking music directors. His rechristened name Chaitanya was familiar only inside the film fraternity and the audience could not relate his new name with his original name.

On insistence of actor Dr. Vishnuvardhan, his original name was credited with his compositions for the film Bellary Naga (2009) which proved to be the last feature film of the legendary actor. After a brief hiatus, Shastri returned to composing for the films Flop (2015) and Melody (2015) which marked his reunion with director Nanjunda who gave him the first break as a composer.

Discography

As composer

As singer (selected)

Awards

Karnataka State Film Awards

 1996 – Karnataka State Film Award for Best Male Playback Singer – "Kolumande Jangamadevaru" (film: Janumada Jodi)

Death
L. N. Shastri died on 30 August 2017, after a brief battle with intestinal cancer.

References

External links
L. N. Shastry biography

1971 births
2017 deaths
Indian male playback singers
Indian male musicians
Kannada playback singers
Kannada film score composers
Deaths from cancer in India
Indian male film score composers